Shaun Dominic Ley (born 14 June 1969) is a British journalist and newsreader for BBC News. A former regular presenter of The World This Weekend and The World at One on BBC Radio 4, he currently appears regularly on the BBC's domestic BBC News and international BBC World News channels, as well as on BBC Weekend News bulletins on BBC One. He also frequently hosts Dateline London, and has presented a wide range of BBC programmes from HARDTalk to BBC Radio 4's PM and The World Tonight.

As of October 2021, Shaun Ley is a regular weekday evening presenter (20:00-21:00 & 22:30-23:00 & 23:30-00:00) on BBC News. He sometimes hosts the afternoon news (14:00-17:00) occasionally and was the last main presenter of Dateline London, before it ended in October 2022.

Early life 
Shaun Dominic Ley was born on 14 June 1969. He was educated at two state schools in Devon in south west England: at Lynton Primary School, in his home town of Lynton, and at Ilfracombe College, in the seaside resort of Ilfracombe on the North Devon coast, followed by the London School of Economics, in central London.

Career 
After a stint as a schoolboy presenter on the short-lived That's Life! Junior in 1980, Ley joined the BBC as a graduate trainee in 1990, and later worked on the regional news programme Points West. He became Political Editor for the South East Cluster; based at BBC Elstree Centre appearing regularly on the then regional news programme for London and the home counties Newsroom SouthEast, as well as on the clusters radio stations BBC GLR 94.9, BBC Three Counties Radio, and BBC Radios Kent, and Essex. The region was divided in two in 2001 to form BBC London and BBC South East Today. He then presented Around Westminster, before becoming a national political correspondent for the BBC in 2001. He began presenting The World This Weekend in 2005.

On February 2 2023, it was confirmed that Ley – alongside many other presenters of the domestic BBC News Channel – would lose their presenting roles as part of the BBC's relaunched news channel.

Personal life 
Ley is a longtime fan of the BBC series Doctor Who and in 2011 he presented and narrated When Worlds Collide, a documentary accompanying the DVD release of The Happiness Patrol, which looked into the series' political and ideological influences over the years.

References

External links 
 
 BBC profile

1969 births
BBC newsreaders and journalists
BBC Radio 4
Living people
People from North Devon (district)
Television personalities from Devon